Best Of is a compilation album from alternative rock band Voice of the Beehive.  Released in the UK only, it was the second Voice of the Beehive hits collection (the first being 1991's A Portrait).  This compilation featured singles and tracks from the band's first two albums Let It Bee and Honey Lingers.

Track listing
"Don't Call Me Baby" (Bryn, Jones) - 3:05
"Monsters and Angels" (Bryn, Jones) - 3:38
"I Think I Love You" (T. Romeo) - 3:13
"I Say Nothing" (Bryn, Jones) - 3:24
"I Walk the Earth" (Nack) - 3:40
"Perfect Place" (Brooke, Bryn, Jones) - 3:33
"Man in the Moon" (Brooke, Bryn) - 3:12
"Sorrow Floats" (Bryn) - 4:16
"The Beat of Love" (Brooke, Bryn, Nack) - 4:02
"Adonis Blue" (Bryn, Jones) - 3:40
"Look at Me" (Bryn, Jones) - 3:03
"Just Like You" (Brett, Bryn, Jones) - 3:22
"What You Have Is Enough" (Bryn) - 2:33
"Say It" (Bryn, Jones) - 2:28
"Oh Love" (Brooke, Jones) - 2:58
"Beauty to My Eyes" (Bryn) - 3:01
"Trust Me" (Bryn) - 3:17
"There's a  Barbarian in the Back of My Car" (Bryn, Zodiac Mindwarp) - 2:35

References

1997 greatest hits albums
Voice of the Beehive albums
Albums produced by Hugh Jones (producer)
Albums produced by Don Was